The 2015–16 FC Kuban Krasnodar season was their fifth season in the Russian Premier League, the highest tier of association football in Russia.

Squad

Youth squad

Transfers

Summer

In:

Out:

Winter

In:

Out:

Competitions

Russian Premier League

Matches

Table

Relegation play-offs

Russian Cup

Squad statistics

Appearances and goals

|-
|colspan="14"|Players who left Kuban Krasnodar on loan:
|-
|colspan="14"|Players who left Kuban Krasnodar during the season:

|}

Goal scorers

Disciplinary record

References

FC Kuban Krasnodar seasons
Kuban Krasnodar